The Classic Quartet – The Complete Impulse! Recordings is a 1998 box set by jazz musician John Coltrane.

Albums covered
Coltrane’s classic quartet recorded 11 albums for Impulse!:

 Ballads (1962)
 Coltrane (1962)
 Live at Birdland (1963)
 Crescent (1964)
 A Love Supreme (1964)
 The John Coltrane Quartet Plays (1965)
 Living Space (1965)
 Transition (1965)
 Sun Ship (1965)
 First Meditations (1965)
Kulu Sé Mama  (1965) (Side 2 is by the Quartet; side 1 by a larger group)

Albums missed

Some of the Impulse! albums not included (as they did not cover material by the Classic Quartet but by different lineups)
Africa/Brass (1961)
Duke Ellington & John Coltrane (1962)
John Coltrane and Johnny Hartman (1963)
Ascension (1965)
Interstellar Space (1967)
Expression (1967)

Reception

In a review for AllMusic, Thom Jurek wrote: "What transpired over the course of the eight albums and supplementary material used elsewhere is nothing short of a complete transfiguration of one band into another one, from a band that followed the leader into places unknown to one that inspired him and pushed him further. All of this transpired in the span of only three years... There can be no arguing the value of the originally released recordings; whether they were issued during Coltrane's lifetime or after his death, they tell a story that millions of listeners formed their impressions by, true or false, and created a legacy that lives on. But there is also something to be said for setting the record straight, and the chronological approach that this set takes in no way desecrates the integrity of the original albums themselves... Simply put, it is indispensable to those who need a deeper understanding of Coltrane's music and the development of his most influential period. The sound quality is fully remastered to 20-bit technology, and the package is unwieldy but beautiful and sturdy. It's a must."

The authors of The Penguin Guide to Jazz stated: "this is a magnificently packaged and organized document, and it stands as a memorial to one of the truly great groups in the history of jazz."

Writing for All About Jazz, Robert Spencer commented: "the chronological arrangement of this disc allows the listener to hear Coltrane progress ever farther in his quest for new musical expressions and deeper honesty in his communication... By the time one reaches the recordings that made up First Meditations and spelled the turbulent end of the classic quartet, many worlds have been spanned... And much beautiful and inspiring music has been made... these eight discs are remarkable for the breadth of Coltrane's musical vision... There were so many sides to John Coltrane's music that these kind of brilliant contradictions can be found all through this set, and we are all the richer for it. The Complete Impulse! Studio Recordings is a lovingly collected monument to some of the greatest music anyone has ever made."

Ben Ratliff, in an article for The New York Times, wrote: "What more can be said about the records every 50-and-under jazz fan knows?... After one spin, half of this music will be permanently remembered by the budding jazz fan; the other half will take the rest of a lifetime to be understood."

Track listing

Personnel
Recorded between 1961 and 1965 in New York City.

The Classic Quartet:
 John Coltrane — tenor saxophone/soprano saxophone
 McCoy Tyner — piano
 Jimmy Garrison — bass
 Elvin Jones — drums  (all tracks except Dear Old Stockholm recordings)

Additional Performers:
 Art Davis — bass  (only appears on disc 3: tracks 7,8,9)
 Roy Haynes — drums  (only appears on disc 2: tracks 4,5 and disc 4: tracks 3,4,5)

References

Albums produced by Bob Thiele
Compilation albums published posthumously
John Coltrane compilation albums
1998 compilation albums
Impulse! Records compilation albums